Crassispira martiae is a species of sea snail, a marine gastropod mollusk in the family Pseudomelatomidae.

Description

Distribution
This species occurs off the Panama Canal Zone, Pacific Panama.

References

External links
 Biolib.cz: Crassispira martiae
 James H. McLean & Roy Poorman, A Revised Classification of the Family Turridae, with the Proposal of New Subfamilies, Genera, and Subgenera from the Eastern Pacific; The Veliger  vol. 14, 1971
 
 

martiae
Gastropods described in 1971